Scrinium ordinatum is an extinct species of sea snail, a marine gastropod mollusk in the family Mitromorphidae.

Description

Distribution
This extinct marine species is endemic to New Zealand.

References

 Maxwell, P.A. (2009). Cenozoic Mollusca. pp. 232–254 in Gordon, D.P. (ed.) New Zealand inventory of biodiversity. Volume one. Kingdom Animalia: Radiata, Lophotrochozoa, Deuterostomia. Canterbury University Press, Christchurch

ordinatum
Gastropods described in 1877
Gastropods of New Zealand